The Piaggio P.XI was an Italian 14-cylinder radial aircraft engine.  The P.XI was a licensed derivative of the French Gnome-Rhône Mistral Major 14K produced in Italy.  Isotta Fraschini also produced a version of the 14K called the K.14.

Further development led to the P.XIX. This featured an increased compression ratio from 6:1 to 7:1 and an rpm increase from 2,400 to 2,600.

Variants
P.XI
P.XIbis
P.XI R.C.15 (geared, rated altitude )
P.XI R.C.30 (geared, rated altitude )
P.XI R.C.40D
P.XI R.C.40S  (geared, rated altitude ), opposite rotation to 40D.
P.XI R.C.40bis (geared, rated altitude )
P.XI R.2C.40, (geared, rated altitude ), two-speed supercharger.
P.XI C.40 (direct drive, rated altitude )
P.XI R.C.44 (geared, rated altitude )
P.XI R.C.50 (geared, rated altitude )
P.XI R.C.60 (geared, rated altitude )
P.XI R.C.72 (geared, rated altitude )
P.XI R.C.l00
P.XI R.C.100/2v (geared, rated altitude )

Applications
Breda Ba.65 
Breda Ba.88 
CANT Z.1007 
Caproni Ca.135 
Caproni Ca.161 
Reggiane Re 2000 
Saab 17C 
Savoia-Marchetti SM.79B
Savoia-Marchetti SM.84

Specifications (P.XI R.C.40)

See also

References

Notes

Bibliography

 Gunston, Bill. World Encyclopedia of Aero Engines. Cambridge, England. Patrick Stephens Limited, 1989. 

1930s aircraft piston engines
Aircraft air-cooled radial piston engines
P.XI